Borjana Krišto (born 13 August 1961) is a Bosnian Croat politician serving as the 11th Chairwoman of the Council of Ministers of Bosnia and Herzegovina since January 2023. She previously served as the 8th president of the Federation of Bosnia and Herzegovina from 2007 to 2011. She is the first woman to hold both positions.

Krišto holds a degree in law from the Faculty of Law in Banja Luka. Following the 2006 general election, she became president of the Federation of Bosnia and Herzegovina in February 2007, serving until March 2011. In June 2011, Krišto was one of the candidates for nomination to the office of Chairwoman of the Council of Ministers. Ultimately, she was not nominated.

A member of the Croatian Democratic Union since 1995, Krišto was the party's candidate for a seat in the Bosnian Presidency as a Croat member in the 2010 and 2022 general elections. However, she failed to get elected in both elections. She was a member of both the national House of Peoples and House of Representatives as well.

In January 2023, Krišto was appointed Chairwoman of the Council of Ministers, following the 2022 general election.

Early life and education
The daughter of Jože Krželj and Janja, Krišto grew up  in Livno, where she graduated from the high school of economics in 1980. She then obtained a degree from the Faculty of Law in Banja Luka in 1984, and passed the bar exam in Sarajevo.

Krišto worked in the legal department of several companies: "Agro Livno" (1987–1988), "Guber Livno" (1990–1991), "Likom Livno" (1991–1992) and "Livno bus" (1995–1999).

Political career
Krišto entered into politics in 1995, joining the Croatian Democratic Union. She has been the party's deputy president since 2007. Krišto worked as Minister of Justice in the Government of Canton 10 from 1999 to 2000, and later as Secretary of the Cantonal government from 2000 until 2002. At the 2002 general election, she was elected to the Federal House of Representatives. However, she did not become a member, as she was appointed Minister of Justice in the Federal Government.

At the 2006 general election, Krišto was elected to the national House of Representatives. She was also appointed as member of the delegation of Bosnia and Herzegovina to the Parliamentary Assembly of the Council of Europe. She resigned from both legislative posts upon her election as president of the Federation of Bosnia and Herzegovina, one of the two autonomous entities that compose Bosnia and Herzegovina, on 22 February 2007. Krišto was the first woman to serve as Federal president. She served as president until 17 March 2011, when she was succeeded by Živko Budimir.

At the 2010 general election, Krišto ran for a seat in the Presidency of Bosnia and Herzegovina as a Croat member, but was not elected, obtaining only 19.74% of the vote, with Željko Komšić of the Social Democratic Party getting elected with 60.61% of the vote. Following the election, she was appointed member of the national House of Peoples. In June 2011, Krišto was one of the candidates for nomination to the office of Chairwoman of the Council of Ministers. Out of three candidates, she came in third place when ranked by the Bosnian Presidency.

At the 2014 general election, Krišto was once again elected to the national House of Representatives. She was re-elected to office at the 2018 general election. The Croatian Democratic Union announced Krišto's candidacy in the Bosnian general election in June 2022, running once again for Presidency member and representing the Croats. At the general election, held on 2 October 2022, she failed to get elected, having obtained 44.20% of the vote. The incumbent Bosnian Croat presidency member Željko Komšić got re-elected, obtaining 55.80% of the vote.

Chairwoman of the Council of Ministers (2023–present)

Appointment
Following the 2022 general election, a coalition led by the Alliance of Independent Social Democrats, the Croatian Democratic Union and the Social Democratic Party reached an agreement on the formation of a new government, designating Krišto as the new Chairwoman of the Council of Ministers. The Presidency officially nominated her as chairwoman-designate on 22 December.

The national House of Representatives confirmed Krišto's appointment on 28 December, making her the first female Chairwoman of the Council of Ministers. On 25 January 2023, the House of Representatives confirmed the appointment of Krišto's cabinet.

References

External links

Curriculum Vitae 

1961 births
Living people
People from Livno
Croats of Bosnia and Herzegovina
Academic staff of the University of Banja Luka
Bosnia and Herzegovina women in politics
Politicians of the Federation of Bosnia and Herzegovina
Croatian Democratic Union of Bosnia and Herzegovina politicians
Presidents of the Federation of Bosnia and Herzegovina
Members of the House of Peoples of Bosnia and Herzegovina
Members of the House of Representatives (Bosnia and Herzegovina)
Chairmen of the House of Representatives (Bosnia and Herzegovina)
21st-century women politicians
20th-century women politicians